Colleen Murphy may refer to:

 Colleen Murphy (filmmaker), Canadian screenwriter, director, and playwright
 Colleen 'Cosmo' Murphy, American radio host